Thieves by Law, or Ganavim Ba Hok is a 2010 documentary film charting the rise of Russian organized crime in the wake of the fall of the Soviet Union. In the film several noted crime figures are interviewed, a number of which are currently wanted by Interpol.

References

External links
 

Israeli documentary films
2010 films
German documentary films
Documentary films about organized crime in Russia
2010s Russian-language films
Hebrew-language films
Thieves in law
2010 documentary films
Works about the Russian Mafia
2010s German films